Myasnikov or Miasnikov is a Russian language family name. It derives from the Russian word  (‘butcher’) or from the Armenian male name derived from the Persian name Misagh (romanized as Mithaq).

Myasnikov may refer to:

Gavril Myasnikov (1889–1945), Russian revolutionary
Gennady Myasnikov (1919–1989), Soviet production designer
Viktor Myasnikov (born 1948), retired hurdler
Georg Myasnikov (1926–1996), Soviet CPSU, state and public figure, historian, and local history specialist
Aleksandr Myasnikov (1886–1925), prominent Bolshevik
Aleksandr Myasnikov, Russian field hockey player

Karina Myasnikova, Russian artistic gymnast
Yulia Myasnikova, Kazakhstani football defender
Varvara Myasnikova (1900-1978), Soviet actress.
Ekaterina Kozitskaya, née Myasnikova, (1746–1833) Russian industrialist

See also 

Russian-language surnames